(born ; 10 July 1953), is a member of the Japanese Imperial Family as the widow of Norihito, Prince Takamado.

Background and education
Hisako was born on 10 July 1953 in Shirokane, Tokyo.  She is the eldest daughter of Japanese industrialist Shigejiro Tottori. Hisako accompanied her father to England, where he was transferred for work, and while still a child became fluent in the English language. She subsequently graduated from Girton College, Cambridge in 1975 with undergraduate degrees in anthropology and archaeology. On her return to Japan, she obtained a position working for a translation company, but soon returned to England to learn about legal terminology used in statutes. She returned to Japan again in 1982. After her return, she was hired to assist Prince Mikasa as an interpreter and assistant at the 31st International Asian-North African Cultural Symposium. Princess Takamado received a PhD in arts from the Osaka University of Arts in February 2012.

Marriage and family
On 23 April 1984, she attended a reception hosted by the Embassy of Canada in Tokyo, where she first met Norihito, Prince Takamado. He proposed on 20 May and the Imperial Household Council announced the engagement on 1 August 1984. The formal engagement ceremony made on 17 September 1984, and the wedding held on 6 December 1984. They have three daughters:

 

Public service

Prince and Princess Takamado were the most widely traveled couple in the Japanese Imperial Family, visiting 35 countries together in 15 years to represent Japan on various functions. The Prince's last visits included Egypt and Morocco in May 2000, Hawaii in July 2001 (to promote the Japanese tea ceremony), and to the Republic of Korea from May to June 2002. The latter was in order to attend the Opening Ceremony of the 2002 FIFA World Cup Korea-Japan. The goodwill visit by the Prince and Princess to Korea was the first Japanese royal visit since World War II, and was an important step in the promotion of friendly bilateral relations between Japan and Korea. While in Korea, the couple toured the country extensively, met with President Kim Dae-jung and ordinary Koreans, and he visited the facilities for the physically disabled in South Korea that the Princess Masako Nashimoto had sponsored.

Prince Takamado died of ventricular fibrillation while playing squash with the Canadian ambassador, Robert G. Wright, at the Canadian Embassy, leaving a widow and three young daughters. Since the Prince's death, Princess Takamado has been extremely active in a very large number of charitable organizations involving sports, cultural exchange and the environment, taking on all of the posts formerly held by her late husband, as well as numerous new posts. Since November 2002, the princess has served as the Honorary President of the Prince Takamado Trophy, All Japan-Middle School English Oratorical Contest.

In June 2003, she visited Dublin, Ireland for the 2003 Special Olympics World Summer Games. In June 2004, she made an official visit to Canada, traveling extensively across the nation as part of the 75th Anniversary of the formal diplomatic relations between Canada and Japan. During this visit, she received two honorary doctorates in Law, one from the University of Alberta and the other from the University of Prince Edward Island.

In March 2004, the Princess was elected to succeed Queen Noor of Jordan as honorary president of BirdLife International. In November 2004, she visited Bangkok, Thailand, to attend the 3rd IUCN World Conference as honorary president of BirdLife International. She visited Montevideo, Uruguay in 2008, and Buenos Aires, Argentina for the Birdlife World Conservation Conference. During this visit, she attended special high goal polo exhibition played by the Novillo Astrada brothers in her honor at the La Aguada Polo Club.

In June 2005, she visited Germany to attend the 2005 FIFA Confederations Cup, attending matches between Germany against Argentina, and Japan against Brazil. Afterwards, she visited Jordan to attend the royal wedding of Princess Badiya bint El Hassan. In November of the same year, returned to England for the Global Council Meeting of BirdLife International. In January 2006, she returned to Canada to attend the opening of the "Prince Takamado Gallery of Japan" at the Royal Ontario Museum. She also returned to Germany later that year in order to attend the 2006 FIFA World Cup.

In June 2013, she visited Sweden to attend the wedding of Princess Madeleine of Sweden and Christopher O'Neill. In July 2017, she visited Dublin, Ireland to celebrate the 60th anniversary of modern Ireland–Japan relations. In August 2019, she visited Edmonton, Canada to celebrate the 90th anniversary of diplomatic relations between Japan and Canada. In November 2022, she visited Qatar to watch 2022 FIFA World Cup.

Health 
In March 2020, Princess Takamado underwent surgery for acute appendicitis at the University of Tokyo Hospital. On 17 March, she was discharged after checking and verifying that the operation had gone well.

In November 2022, it was announced that Princess Takamado had tested positive for COVID-19 and would be convalescing at her residence. Her symptoms included fever and sore throat.

Bibliography
The Princess is the author of two children's books published in English; Katie and the Dream-Eater (OUP, 1996) and Lulie the Iceberg (OUP, 1998).

Titles and styles

Since her marriage, Hisako is styled as Her Imperial Highness Princess Takamado.

Honours

National honours
 : Grand Cordon of the Order of the Precious Crown
 : Dame of the Decoration of the Red Cross
 : Recipient of the Red Cross Medal

Foreign honours
  : Grand Cross of the Order of Prince Henry (02/12/1993)
  : Dame Grand Cross of the Order of Isabella the Catholic (08/11/2008)
  : Recipient of the 70th Birthday Badge Medal of King Carl XVI Gustaf (30/04/2016)

Honorary degrees

 Honorary degree in Law (University of Alberta, 2004)
 Honorary degree in Law (University of Prince Edward Island, 2004)
 Honorary degree in Education (Hannam University, 2014)
 Honorary degree (Josai University, 2015)

Honorary positions
 Patron of the Federation of Japan Amateur Orchestras Corp
 Honorary President of the Ikebana International
 Honorary President of the Amateur Rubberball Baseball Association of Japan
 Honorary President of the Japan Fencing Federation
 Honorary President of the Marine Rescue Japan
 Honorary President of the Japan Hockey Association
 Honorary Patron of the Japan Football Association
 Honorary President of the Japan Spanish Society
 Honorary Patron of Center for Promotion of Folk-Performing Arts
 Honorary President of the Inamori Foundation
 Honorary President of the Japan Sailing Federation
 Honorary Patron of the Japan National Student Association Fund
 Honorary Patron of the Asiatic Society of Japan
 Honorary Patron of Les Amies de Langue Française
 Honorary Governorship of the Japan-Egypt Association
 Honorary President of BirdLife International
 Honorary President of the International Kyudo Federation
 Honorary President of the Prince Takamado Memorial Foundation for Japan-Korea Exchange
 Honorary Chairman of the International Education Center Supporter Association
 Honorary Patron of Ninnakai (Ninnaji Temple, Kyoto)
 Honorary Patron of Chuguji Hosankai (Chuguji Temple, Nara)
 Honorary Patron of The AED Foundation of Japan
 Honorary Patron of Japan Heart Foundation
 Honorary President of Japan Sea Cadet Federation
 Honorary Patron of the Rifle Association Foundation of Japan
 Honorary Patron of the Japan Handball Association
 Honorary Patron of the Mamasan Volleyball Federation Nippon
 Honorary Chairman of the International Education Center Supporter Association
 Honorary Vice-President of the Japanese Red Cross Society
 Honorary Patron for Asia, Bird life International's Rare Bird Club
 Guest Professor of Osaka University of Arts

Issue

References

External links

 Her Imperial Highness Princess Takamado and her family at the Imperial Household Agency website
 EXPO 2005 Canada | Princess Takamado Visit

1953 births
20th-century Japanese women
21st-century Japanese women
Alumni of Girton College, Cambridge
Dames Grand Cross of the Order of Isabella the Catholic
Grand Cordons (Imperial Family) of the Order of the Precious Crown
Japanese princesses
Kadōka
Living people
Princesses by marriage